Shevtsov (feminine: Shevtsova) is a Russian-language surname derived from the Ukrainian term shvets for "cobbler/shoemaker", literally meaning "child of cobbler".

During the Soviet times, Russian names and surnames in international passports were transliterated using French-language system, and these surnames were spelled as Chevtsov/Chevtsova. 

The surname may refer to:

 Andrei Shevtsov (born 1961), Russian football player
 Illya Shevtsov (born 2000), Ukrainian football player
 Irina Shevtsova (born 1983), Russian mathematician
 Lilia Shevtsova (born 1949), Ukrainian Kremlinology expert
 Lyubov Shevtsova (1924–1943), Soviet partisan
 Lyudmila Shevtsova (born 1934), Russian athlete
 Makar Shevtsov (born 1980), Russian football player
 Oleg Shevtsov (born 1971), Russian ice hockey player
 Tatiana Shevtsova (born 1969), Russian politician
 Vasily Shevtsov (born 1975), Russian actor
 Yuri Shevtsov (born 1959), Belarusian handball player

See also
 Shvets
 Shevchuk
 Shevchenko

Russian-language surnames
Occupational surnames
Surnames of Ukrainian origin